Parasiccia ochrorubens is a moth of the subfamily Arctiinae. It was described by Paul Mabille in 1900. It is found on Madagascar.

References

Lithosiini
Moths described in 1900